The Roman Catholic Diocese of Larantuka is a suffragan Latin diocese in the Ecclesiastical province of the Metropolitan of Ende in Indonesia's Lesser Sunda Islands.

Its cathedral episcopal see is Katedral Reinha Rosari (dedicated to Mary as Queen of the Rosary) in the city of Larantuka, in Nusa Tenggara Timur.

History 
 Established on March 8, 1951 as Apostolic Vicariate of Larantuka, on territory split off from the Apostolic Vicariate of Isole della Piccola Sonda (Lesser Sunda).
 Promoted on January 3, 1961 as Diocese of Larantuka

Episcopal ordinaries
(all Roman Rite) Apostolic Vicar of Larantuka  
 Gabriel Manek, Divine Word Missionaries (S.V.D.) (March 8, 1951 – January 3, 1961), Titular Bishop of Alinda (1951.03.08 – 1961.01.03), later Metropolitan Archbishop of Ende (Indonesia) (1961.01.03 – 1968.12.19), retired as Titular Archbishop of Bavagaliana (1968.12.19 – 1976.05.15)Suffragan Bishops of Larantuka'' 
 Antoine Hubert Thijssen, S.V.D. (January 3, 1961 – February 23, 1973), previously Titular Bishop of Nilopolis (1951.03.08 – 1961.01.03) & Apostolic Vicar of Endeh (Indonesia) (1951.03.08 – 1961.01.03), later Apostolic Administrator of Denpasar (Indonesia) (1973 – 1980.09.04) and Titular Bishop of Eguga (1973.02.23 – 1982.06.07)
 Darius Nggawa, S.V.D. (February 28, 1974 – June 16, 2004)
 Franciscus Kopong Kung (June 16, 2004 – ...), succeeding as former Coadjutor Bishop of Larantuka (Indonesia) (2001.10.02 – 2004.06.16)

Sources and external links
 GCatholic.org, with incumbent biography links
 Catholic Hierarchy

Roman Catholic dioceses in Indonesia
Christian organizations established in 1951
Roman Catholic dioceses and prelatures established in the 20th century
Flores Island (Indonesia)
1951 establishments in Indonesia